Shepelev is a Russian masculine surname, its feminine counterpart is Shepeleva. It may refer to
Anton Shepelew (born 1989), Belarusian football player 
Roman Shepelev (born 1993), Russian water polo player
Sergei Shepelev (born 1955), Russian ice hockey player
Svetlana Șepelev-Tcaci (born 1969), Moldovan long-distance runner
Volodymyr Shepelyev (born 1997), Ukrainian football player

Russian-language surnames